Almond Point is a rocky point between Whitecloud Glacier and McNeile Glacier at the head of Charcot Bay, Trinity Peninsula, Antarctica. Charted in 1948 by the Falkland Islands Dependencies Survey who applied the name because of the distinctive shape of the point.

References
 

Headlands of Trinity Peninsula